Episodes may refer to:

 Episode, a part of a dramatic work 
 Episodes (TV series), a British/American television sitcom which premiered in 2011
 Episodes (journal), a geological science journal
 Episodes (ballet), a ballet by George Balanchine and Martha Graham
 Episodes (album), a compilation album by Mike Oldfield
 Episodes (Younes Elamine album), an album released by Younes Elamine in 2013

Episodes is abbreviated as eps (noun ep).

See also
 :Category:Lists of episodes